"Lies and Truth" is the seventh single by L'Arc-en-Ciel, released on November 21, 1996 it reached number 6 on the Oricon chart. The single was re-released on August 30, 2006.

Track listing

Chart positions

References

1996 singles
L'Arc-en-Ciel songs
Songs written by Hyde (musician)
Songs written by Ken (musician)
1996 songs
Ki/oon Music singles